Fordhook Farm, also known as Burpee Farm, is an historic farm and national historic district located at Doylestown Township, Bucks County, Pennsylvania. It encompasses 12 contributing buildings and 2 contributing structures. They include the houses, barn, spring house, ice house, carriage house, "farm house," "cottage" and seed house, and two greenhouses.  The main house is constructed of fieldstone, and the oldest section pre-dates 1798.  Washington Atlee Burpee (1858-1915) purchased the farm in 1888.  The farm was used for experimentation and seed production by Burpee Seeds until 1981.

It was added to the National Register of Historic Places in 1987.

References

External links
 Burpee Farm

Historic districts in Bucks County, Pennsylvania
Farms on the National Register of Historic Places in Pennsylvania
Historic districts on the National Register of Historic Places in Pennsylvania
National Register of Historic Places in Bucks County, Pennsylvania